David Nason Frizzell was an American politician from Indiana. Frizzell was a Republican member of the Indiana House of Representatives for District 93.

Early life 
On January 17, 1950, Frizzell was born in Baltimore, Maryland.

Education 
In 1973, Frizzell earned a Bachelor of Arts degree from Loyola College, Maryland.

Career 
Frizzell was a Republican member of the Indiana House of Representatives for District 93 from 1992 to 2019. Frizzell was the Assistant Majority Floor Leader for the Indiana House of Representatives since 2014.

In April 2019, Frizzell resigned as a member of Indiana House of Representatives for District 93. 

Dollyne Sherman was elected to complete the remaining term.

Personal life 
Frizzell's wife is Valda Frizzell. They have two children. Frizzell and his family live in Indianapolis, Indiana.

References

External links
 David Frizzell at ballotpedia.org

 http://www.frizzellfor93.com/
 https://web.archive.org/web/20160607175649/http://www.indianahouserepublicans.com/members/leadership/dave-frizzell
State Representative David Frizzell official Indiana State Legislature site
 

Members of the Indiana House of Representatives
Living people
Politicians from Indianapolis
Politicians from Baltimore
1950 births
21st-century American politicians